Tyrone Sawyer II (born February 22, 1986) is retired Bahamian sprinter from Nassau, Bahamas who competed in the 100m and 200m and 400m. He attended St.John's College Highs School before competing for University of New Haven. Sawyer graduated with his Masters of Business Administration from Nova Southeastern University. He is now an author and businessman who owns an international education and entertainment company named Jemima's Playhouse. The company was named after his wife Jemima Sawyer.

Sawyer competed at the 2004 World Junior Championships in Athletics in Grosseto, Italy.

Personal bests

References

External links
 World Athletics

1986 births
Living people
Bahamian male sprinters
People from Nassau, Bahamas
Sportspeople from Nassau, Bahamas
Athletes (track and field) at the 2007 Pan American Games
Pan American Games competitors for the Bahamas
Junior college men's track and field athletes in the United States